Carlos Alcántara  may refer to:

 Carlos Alcántara (actor) (born 1964), Peruvian stand-up comedian and actor
 Carlos Alcántara (cyclist) (born 1948), Uruguayan cyclist
 Carlos Alcántara (footballer) (born 1985), Spanish footballer